James Beaton "Peggy" O'Neil (April 3, 1913 – October 17, 1997) was a Canadian ice hockey player. He played 165 National Hockey League games between 1933 and 1942, including nine in the playoffs.

Early life 
O'Neil was born in Semans, Saskatchewan.

Career 
He played for the Boston Bruins and the Montreal Canadiens. The rest of his career, which lasted from 1931 to 1946, was mainly spent in the American Hockey League.

O'Neil scored six NHL goals, all for Boston. The first one occurred at Boston Garden on January 9, 1934. It was the only Boston goal in the team's 2-1 home loss to the New York Americans.

He played 447 regular season AHL games and another 43 in the post-season. His best offensive season in the AHL was 1942–1943, when he scored 19 goals and had 50 assists for 69 points in 55 games for 1.25 points per game. The next season, he scored 20 goals for the only time in his career. After he retired from playing in 1946, he coached the Fenn College Foxes hockey team.

Personal life 
O'Neil and his wife, Betty, had three children. They settled in the Highlands neighborhood in Edmonton, Alberta, Canada.

Career statistics

Regular season and playoffs

External links 
 

1913 births
1997 deaths
Boston Bruins players
Boston Cubs players
Canadian ice hockey right wingers
Cleveland Barons (1937–1973) players
Cleveland State Vikings men's ice hockey coaches
Hershey Bears players
Ice hockey people from Saskatchewan
Montreal Canadiens players
New Haven Eagles players
Providence Reds players
Washington Lions players
Canadian expatriate ice hockey players in the United States